HMS Norwich was a 50-gun fourth rate ship of the line of the Royal Navy, launched at Deptford on 24 August 1693.

She was rebuilt according to the 1706 Establishment at Chatham Dockyard, relaunching on 20 May 1718. In 1744 she was reduced to a fifth rate and renamed HMS Enterprise.

Engagements
HMS Norwich took part in the destruction of the fortress of San Lorenzo el Real Chagres (22-24 March 1740), in Panama, as part of a squadron commanded by Vice-Admiral Edward Vernon during the War of Jenkins' Ear.

Given the overwhelming superiority of the English forces, Captain Don Juan Carlos Gutiérrez Cevallos surrendered the fort on 24 March, after resisting for two days. In 1743 as part of a squadron commanded by Commodore Charles Knowles participated in the failed attacks to La Guayra and Puerto Cabello.

In the 1744 she was renamed as HMS Enterprise and patrolled the Caribbean until the end of the War of the Spanish Succession in 1748, when she was laid up in ordinary.

Enterprise was recommissioned in 1756 at the outbreak of the Seven Years' War, again for service in the West Indies and North America and resumed her duties as Atlantic convoy escort.  In 1762 she was present at the siege and capture of Havana, Cuba, an action involving nearly 60 warships and transports enough for more than 16,000 troops.

Enterprise was decommissioned in January 1764 and was broken up in 1771 at Sheerness.

Notes

References

Lavery, Brian (2003) The Ship of the Line - Volume 1: The development of the battlefleet 1650-1850. Conway Maritime Press. .

Ships of the line of the Royal Navy
1690s ships